Callodirphia is a genus of moths in the family Saturniidae first described by Charles Duncan Michener in 1949.

Species
Callodirphia arpi (Schaus, 1908)

References

Hemileucinae